Francesco da Volterra was an Italian painter. He resided in Pisa from 1370 to 1372, where, from the records of the Campo Santo, he painted the History of Job on the south wall.  Like the rest of the earlier pictures in the Campo Santo, it is now almost obliterated, but some idea of its weird realism may still be formed from Lasinio's Pitture del Campo Santo and other reproductions in Italian books on art. Francesco da Volterra is supposed to have been identical with Francesco di Maestro Giotto, a painter of Florence, whose name occurs in the records of the city Guild for 1341.

References

People from Volterra
14th-century Italian painters
Italian male painters
Painters from Tuscany
Year of birth missing
Year of death missing